Kingsbury Episcopi is a village and civil parish on the River Parrett in Somerset, England, situated  north west of Yeovil in the South Somerset district.  The village has a population of 1,307. The parish includes the villages of West Lambrook, East Lambrook and Thorney.

History
The "Episcopi" part of the village's name means "of the Bishop" in Latin. It refers to the fact that the village belonged to the Bishop of Bath and Wells and not the nearby abbey at Muchelney.

The parish was part of the Kingsbury Hundred,

Thorney suffered serious flooding during the Winter flooding of 2013–14 on the Somerset Levels.

Governance
The parish council has responsibility for local issues, including setting an annual precept (local rate) to cover the council’s operating costs and producing annual accounts for public scrutiny. The parish council evaluates local planning applications and works with the local police, district council officers, and neighbourhood watch groups on matters of crime, security, and traffic. The parish council's role also includes initiating projects for the maintenance and repair of parish facilities, as well as consulting with the district council on the maintenance, repair, and improvement of highways, drainage, footpaths, public transport, and street cleaning. Conservation matters (including trees and listed buildings) and environmental issues are also the responsibility of the council.

The village falls within the Non-metropolitan district of South Somerset, which was formed on 1 April 1974 under the Local Government Act 1972, having previously been part of Langport Rural District. The district council is responsible for local planning and building control, local roads, council housing, environmental health, markets and fairs, refuse collection and recycling, cemeteries and crematoria, leisure services, parks, and tourism.

Somerset County Council is responsible for running the largest and most expensive local services such as education, social services, libraries, main roads, public transport, policing and  fire services, trading standards, waste disposal and strategic planning.

The village falls within the 'Burrow Hill' electoral ward. The ward stretches from Muchelney in the north, to Puckington in the south west. The total population of this ward at the 2011 census was 2,211.

It is also part of the Somerton and Frome county constituency represented in the House of Commons of the Parliament of the United Kingdom. It elects one Member of Parliament (MP) by the first past the post system of election.

Landmarks

Other historic buildings in the village include many old houses, the former pub the Wyndham Arms, Wesleyan church and an octagonal village lock-up that was used to detain drunks and suspected criminals.

The East Lambrook Manor dates from the 15th century. It has been designated by English Heritage as a Grade II* listed building. The garden was planted by Margery Fish from 1938 until her death in 1969. She wrote several books on cottage gardens and held the National Collection of Geraniums, and a collection of snowdrops.

Religious sites
Pevsner describes the chancel and chapels of the church as "gloriously lit" and advises visiting on a fine morning. He writes that the nave is older than the rest of the church, "no doubt of before 1400, and not yet infected with the later exuberance" of the Late Perpendicular style of the tower and other parts of St Martin's. Poyntz Wright suggests the west tower was built in 1515. It has been designated by English Heritage as a Grade I listed building.

The church of St James in East Lambrook dates from the 12th century.

Culture
Kingsbury is known for its May Festival which is held on the May Day Bank Holiday and attracts over 4,000 visitors. Another popular attraction is the Lowland Games, where events include mud wrestling, river raft racing and bale racing, while locally brewed cider is available.

Other nearby places of interest include the Burrow Hill Cider Farm.

The mid-summer Lowland Games have been held near the village of Thorney annually since 1984.

The River Parrett Trail, a walking route that follows the course of the river, passes through the village.

References

External links

 Kingsbury May Festival
 Parish website
 Parish Boundary, ecclesiastical

Villages in South Somerset
Civil parishes in Somerset